David Menut (born 11 March 1992) is a French cyclist, who currently rides for UCI Cyclo-cross Pro Team Cross Team Legendre.

Major results

Road

2014
 1st Paris–Mantes-en-Yvelines
 2nd Overall Tour de Gironde
1st  Young rider classification
2015
 1st Paris–Troyes
 6th Tour de Vendée
2016
 6th Cholet-Pays de Loire
 8th Boucles de l'Aulne
 9th Grand Prix de la Somme
 10th La Roue Tourangelle
2017
 4th Grand Prix de Fourmies
 4th La Drôme Classic
 9th Grand Prix de la ville de Pérenchies
 10th Grand Prix d'Isbergues

Cyclo-cross

2009–2010
 1st  National Junior Championships
 7th UCI World Junior Championships
2010–2011
 Challenge la France
1st Saint-Jean-de-Monts
2013–2014
 2nd National Under-23 Championships
 7th UCI World Under-23 Championships
2014–2015
 Coupe de France
3rd Sisteron
2018–2019
 2nd Trofeo San Andrés
 2nd Abadiñoko udala saria
 3rd Overall Coupe de France
2nd Razès
 3rd Troyes Cyclocross International
2019–2020
 1st Overall Coupe de France
1st Bagnoles-de-l'Orne
2nd Andrezieux-Boutheon
 1st Trofeo San Andres
 3rd Elorrioko Basqueland Ziklokrosa
 3rd Cyclo-cross des Crouchaux
2020–2021
 2nd CX Täby Park
 3rd National Championships
 3rd Ciclo-cross Ciudad de Xàtiva
2021–2022
 Coupe de France
2nd Pierric
 2nd Brumath Cross Days
 3rd Cyclo-cross International de la Solidarité

References

External links

People from Guéret
1992 births
Living people
French male cyclists
Sportspeople from Creuse
Cyclo-cross cyclists
Cyclists from Nouvelle-Aquitaine